Daidzin is a natural organic compound in the class of phytochemicals known as isoflavones. Daidzin can be found in Japanese plant kudzu (Pueraria lobata, Fabaceae) and from soybean leaves.

Daidzin is the 7-O-glucoside of daidzein.

Daidzin has shown the potential for the treatment of alcohol dependency (antidipsotropic) based on animal models.

List of plants that contain the chemical 
 Pueraria candollei
 Pueraria lobata
 Pueraria thomsonii
 Pueraria thunbergiana

Notes and references

See also 
 Daidzein

Isoflavone glucosides